A Band of Orcs is an American metal band formed in Santa Cruz, California, in 2007. The current band line up includes five members known only as: Cretos Filthgrinder, Gahzgûhl Coffinfeeder, Srig Foehammer, Oog Skullbasher and Gronk!. The band claims to be a tribe of Orc warriors sent to Earth by "The Gruesome Grimp" to "bring forth the Domination" They provide a very theatrical live show and always appear wearing very detailed silicone masks. They have played with notable acts such as GWAR, 3 Inches of Blood, Deicide, Master and ArnoCorps among others.

Their debut EP, "Warchiefs of the Apocalypse" was released on August 15, 2007. On November 23, 2007, Iron Maiden front-man Bruce Dickinson played the track “Bring Out Your Dead” on The Bruce Dickinson Rock Show broadcast on the BBC. Currently, they are signed to Itchy Metal Entertainment (IME)/Heavy Metal-World.

Musical style 
A Band of Orcs play in a style generally characterizable as death metal, although they themselves refer to it as "Brutal Orc Metal".

Stage performance 

The group generally puts on an elaborate live show featuring props, faux battles with one another and plastic weapons they hand out to audience members. Before their performance, they commonly play a slightly altered version of the track "Descent" from their EP, Warchiefs of the Apocalypse, as introduction music.

The show is peppered with commentary from each member in broken English, especially lead singer Gogog Bloodthroat who is known to give commands to the audience and make apocalyptic speeches between songs.

Characters 

A Band of Orcs consists of five musicians who each portray a unique character of the Orc race, as in many popular games and works of fiction. They each wear very detailed masks and costumes at all times when representing the band and rarely break character. Because of this, their identities are widely unknown.

The characters are:

 Gogog Bloodthroat /Jerrad Landon Laign (Vocals 2009 - 2014) [former] Will Keen (former)(2008-2009) The "leader" of A Band of Orcs. He gets his name from the wound on his neck caused by an arrow. (presumably a reference to Gruumsh from the Dungeons and Dragons universe)
 Gronk! (Bass) - The "Shaman" of A Band of Orcs. His name translates to ‘the-rumbling-sound-of-earth-quake-that-precedes-the-volcano-eruption’ Also seems to be the most capable with English.
 Hulg ElfRipper (Rhythm Guitars) [former] - A zombie Orc, killed by lead guitarist Cretos and subsequently reanimated.
 Cretos Filthgrinder/Andrew Soto (Lead guitars) Consistently claims to be the sexiest Orc. Solos are his trademark.
 Oog Skullbasher (Drums) - Oog likes to bang stuff, so he plays drums.

Discography

References

External links 
 

Bands with fictional stage personas
Death metal musical groups from California
Masked musicians
Orcs in popular culture
Musical groups established in 2007
2007 establishments in California